Malacca High School (MHS) is a secondary school in Malacca, Malaysia. Founded on 7 December 1826, it is the second oldest recorded school in the country after only Penang Free School. It was awarded cluster school status and is known as one of the premier schools in Malaysia.

History

Establishment
On 7 December 1826, MHS was officially established; just after Malacca was made a British colony on 17 March 1824, when the Dutch ceded Malacca to the English after the Anglo-Dutch Treaty of 1824.

The establishment of the school (then known as Malacca Free School) was initiated by Thomas H. Moor who came to Malacca in 1825 on orders by William Milne who was one of the educators at the Anglo-Chinese College. In his letter dated 4 January 1825, he stated his wishes to Arundel in London to establish a school. The establishment of the school was also supported by some influential people including James Humphrey, a Superintendent in the London Missionary Society. The startup of Malacca High School was directly related to the closing of the Dutch-Malay school which was established in January 1815 by Christian missionary during the Dutch reign. The school was closed when Malacca was handed over to the British by the Dutch.

School motto

Meliora Hic Sequamur 
This old main motto stands for "Here We Strive For Better Things". The motto was introduced by the Principal of Malacca High School L.W. Arnold. He was stationed in the school from 1931 to 1934. The use of the motto coincided with the shifting of the school from the High Court Building to the current location. The official opening of the school was in October 1931. The Motto obviously was chose to coincide with the abbreviation of MHS for the school. And that Headmaster Arnold was definitely purposeful in giving the translation of Meliora Hic Sequamur (=MHS) for the Malacca High School (=MHS) as such according to his own interpretation.A check with its actual Latin meaning, shows that the translation should have been "Let us follow (sequamur) the melody ( meloria) here (hic)"

School emblem
The school emblem was introduced in 1931. During this time the School Board of Governors was established and the motto "Meliora Hic Sequamur" was established. Originally, the school emblem reflected ‘History,’Resilience’ and ‘Strength’.

The ‘A Famosa’ logo was used and the colour of green and maroon were used. At the bottom of the logo, ‘ Meliora Hic Sequamur‘ was etched. At the beginning, this logo was used by the school prefects only but from 1970 all students wear the logo.

Principals 
 1826 - T.H. Moor
 1843 - John Overee
 1862 - T. Smith
 1878 - Alex Armstrong (A. Armstrong)
 1893 - J. Howell
 1916 - C.F.C. Ayre
 1921 - C. Beamish
 1924 - C.G. Coleman
 1930 - T.A.O. Sullivan
 1931 - L.W. Arnold
 1934 - L.A.S. Jermyn
 1941 - C.A. Scott, Lee Chin Lin
 1945 - Goh Tiow Chong
 1946 - C. Foster, C.J. Gurney
 1950 - G.P. Dartford
 1952 - F.T. Laidlaw, E.H. Bromley
 1956 - A. Atkinson
 1957 - W. Gibson
 1958 - K. Kandiah, Ee Tiang Hong
 1960 - C.T. Wade, Goh Keat Seng
 1965 - Tan Teik Hock
 1969 - Lim Leng Lee
 1970 - K. Anandarajan
 1972 - Chan Ying Tat
 1985 - Abdul Rafie Mahat
 1991 - Mohammad Ismail
 1994 - Hussin Abdul Hamid
 1996 - Mohd Zin Abdul Hamid
 1998 - Othman Ibrahim
 2000 - Noh Ahmad
 2001 - Ya'amah Mohd Dris
 2003 - Mohd Ali Saed
 2006 - Yusof Ahmad
 2007 - Abd. Razak Che Ngah
 2014 - Ramnan Saidun

Notable alumni

Politics and Civil Service 
 Lim Guan Eng, MP for Bagan, and former Chief Minister of Penang and Finance Minister of Malaysia
 Mohd Ali Rustam, Yang di-Pertua Negeri of Melaka
 Abu Zahar Ithnin (Former Malacca Chief Minister)
 M.K. Rajakumar
 Tan Cheng Lock (one of the founding fathers of modern Malaysia and the founder of the Malaysian Chinese Association)
 Tan Siew Sin (former Minister of Commerce and Industry, Finance Minister and former president of the Malayan Chinese Association)

Literature 
 Shirley Geok-Lin Lim (UCLA Professor of English who chairs the School of Education of UCLA, winner of Commonwealth Poetry Prize and National Book Award)

Education 
 Anuwar Ali currently President of Open University Malaysia

Extra-curricular activities 
There are now 9 uniform units. Among them are Scouts, Red Crescent Society, PKBM (Land), Police Cadets, KRS, Fire Brigade Cadets, Marching Band, Silat Seni Gayong and JPA3.

Sports houses 
The house system was introduced in 1923. Every student was assigned a "house" named after historical figures. The sports houses in the school are:
 Albuquerque  
 Famosa  
 Minto  
 Raffles  
 St Francis 
 Van Dieman  

Starting from January 2014, all the sports houses were changed from 6 to 4. The new names for the sport houses are:
 Red   St. Francis
 Yellow/Orange  Raffles
 Blue   Albuquerque
 Green   Famosa

Further reading 
 Malacca High School The Optimist School Magazines
 Our Story' Malacca High School (1826-2006)

References

External links 

 MHS alumni portal 
 Tourism Melaka 
 MHS Official Site
 EarthExplode.Org  Retrieved on 31 May 2007
 EEOrg - History of MHS  Retrieved on 31 May 2007
 EEOrg - MHS Buddhist Society  Retrieved on 31 May 2007

Secondary schools in Malaysia
Buildings and structures in Malacca City
Educational institutions established in 1826
1826 establishments in British Malaya
Publicly funded schools in Malaysia
Christian schools in Malaysia
Boys' schools in Malaysia
Schools in Malacca